Lake Hope State Park is a public recreation area encompassing  within Zaleski State Forest, located  northeast of Zaleski in Vinton County, Ohio. The state park is centered on Lake Hope, a  impoundment on Big Sandy Run.

History
The park and lake are named after the former mining village of Hope, Ohio. The original town of  Hope  still stands under the waters of Lake Hope.  The town was flooded up to the side of a cliff,  which is now used as the swimming area. There is still one original building standing, The old one-room Hope School still stands nearby, in the state forest, and has been renovated for use as a community meeting place. The Moonville Rail-Trail passes close by. Within the park is the old Hope Furnace, which once smelted iron ore mined out of the area's hills.

Established as Lake Hope Forest Park in 1937, it earned its state park appellation with the creation of the Division of Parks and Recreation in 1949. A new park lodge opened in 2013, seven years after the destruction of the original lodge by fire in 2006.

Activities and amenities
The park features boating, fishing, swimming, hiking and mountain biking trails, lodge, cottages, and campground.

References

External links 

Lake Hope State Park Ohio Department of Natural Resources
Lake Hope State Park Map Ohio Department of Natural Resources

State parks of Ohio
Protected areas established in 1937
1937 establishments in Ohio
Protected areas of Vinton County, Ohio
Nature centers in Ohio
Hope
Hope